The 1998–99 Illinois Fighting Illini men's basketball team represented the University of Illinois.

Regular season
The Illini closed out the 1998-99 season with an amazing run at the Big Ten tournament title. After entering the tournament as the 11th-seeded team, Illinois reeled off three straight victories over Top 25-ranked teams before losing in the championship game to second-ranked Michigan State. Illini freshman Cory Bradford was the Big Ten's Freshman of the Year and was also selected to the All-Tournament team.

Roster

Source

Schedule
												
Source																
												

|-
!colspan=12 style="background:#DF4E38; color:white;"| Non-Conference regular season

	

|-
!colspan=9 style="background:#DF4E38; color:#FFFFFF;"|Big Ten regular season

|-
!colspan=9 style="text-align: center; background:#DF4E38"|Big Ten tournament

|-

Player stats

Awards and honors
Cory Bradford
Big Ten Freshman of the Year
Team Most Valuable Player 
 Frank Williams
Fighting Illini All-Century team (2005)

References

Illinois Fighting Illini
Illinois Fighting Illini men's basketball seasons
Illinois Fighting Illini men's basketball team
Illinois Fighting Illini men's basketball team